Buddleja lanata is a species endemic to Ecuador where it grows on dry, windy plateaux amid grasses and bracken at elevations of 1,150 – 2,700 m. The species, first named and described by Bentham in 1845 is now threatened by habitat loss.

Description
Buddleja lanata is a dioecious shrub or subshrub, 0.5 – 1 m high with greyish bark at the base. The stems are terete and lanate, bearing leaves on petioles 0.5 – 2 cm long. The leaves are ovate, 7 – 10 cm long by 4 – 7.5 cm wide, lanate on both sides. The yellow inflorescences have a strong fragrance, and are typically 10 – 25 cm long, comprising 5 – 10 pairs of pedunculate heads in the axils of the reduced terminal leaves. The heads are 1.2 – 1.5 cm in diameter, each with 20 – 25 flowers; the corollas 3.5 – 4.5 mm long, males more open at the throat.

Cultivation
The shrub is not known to be in cultivation.

References

lanata
Flora of Ecuador
Flora of South America
Vulnerable plants
Taxonomy articles created by Polbot
Dioecious plants